Ephraim Vega (born December 2, 1976) is a Puerto Rican American professional wrestler and is best known for his work in Total Nonstop Action Wrestling, under the ring name Machete, and Internationally under the name Ricky Vega. Vega was a standout high school football star, and was named to All-Section, All-conference, and All-county 1st teams his junior and senior year. A knee injury prevented Vega from playing college football, however, he did go on to have a successful career in the Insurance business before deciding on pursuing a wrestling career. Ephraim Vega was a freelance journalist, and wrote a column for Examiner.com/Kansas City, under general sports. Vega currently works in law enforcement as a Police Officer.

Professional wrestling career

Total Nonstop Action Wrestling

In February 2006 at Against All Odds, Vega debuted in Total Nonstop Action Wrestling (TNA) as "Machete", replacing Apollo as a member of The Latin American Xchange (LAX). The LAX lost the match to The James Gang (B.G. James and Kip James) when B.G. pinned Machete. LAX went on to defeat "La Migra" on Impact! and interfere in James Gang matches until the feud came to a head when LAX faced The James Gang in a rematch at Destination X on March 12 but lost after Machete was pinned by Kip.

Machete made his return to TNA on the February 15, 2007 episode of Impact! pushing Konnan, who at that time was using a wheelchair due to hip surgery, to the ring for LAX's tag team match against Shark Boy and Norman Smiley. Machete would play a major role in keeping LAX Tag Champions by interfering first at Against All Odds then again at Destination X in matches against Team 3D. Later at an Impact! taping, he assisted Homicide in defeating Scott Steiner and Brother Devon in a three-way tag match. Vega would also keep Voodoo Kin Mafia (formerly The James Gang) from winning the belts on Impact! by again interjecting himself in the match. Vega was also involved in the Belting Pot match between Team 3D and LAX, which would turn into a gang scuffle between LAX Latino Nation members and Brother Ray's Italian Brotherhood. He would work as LAX's enforcer for a brief time before deciding to take an offer from the IWA in Puerto Rico.

Independent career
Ricky Vega began his independent wrestling career working for teacher Johnny Rodz and his World of Unpredictable Wrestling (WUW) company in Brooklyn, New York. Vega would capture his first title while wrestling for the WUW and win its annual royal rumble-battle royal. The object is to throw all of your opponents over the top rope and be the last man standing consisting of 20 to 50 wrestlers in the ring at a time. His North American title reign was short lived however after Rodz found that Vega had begun working the Pennsylvania independent circuit without his approval. Vega and Rodz would work things out and Vega began working for Pro Pain Pro Wrestling (3PW). 3PW owner's Jasmine St. Claire and The Blue Meanie were introduced to Vega by Matt Striker

Vega also began working shows for Afa's World Xtreme Wrestling (WXW) around the time he began his stint in 3PW. Vega wrestled against such notables as Samu, D-Ray 3000 and Matt Striker. Vega was also exposed to his first taste of television exposure in the North East.

Dynamite Championship Wrestling
Vega made his way to Dynamite Championship Wrestling in August 2006. He debuted by defeating Viper. With the win he earned an immediate Heavyweight title match due to Hector Guerrero vacating the championship. He would go on to defeat Matt Bentley and become champion. Vega would later be stripped and the title held vacant setting the stage for a title tournament. Vega would defeat Bobby Barretta and JB Cool to move into the finals against Glacier. Vega and Glacier had developed a friendship in DCW saving each other on past events. The match seemed to be competitive and fair until Don Kiko Cabana came down to ring side and assisted Vega in regaining the title. Vega would go on to feud with Glacier for the better part of that year, until it all came to a head when they faced off in a Lumberjack match. Vega would again defeat Glacier thanks to Benny Blanco and Simon Sez, who due to Vega's win became commissioner. Vega would go on to successfully defend his title against Team 3D member Brother Devon with the help of Bill DeMott, which set up a tables match with Team 3D facing off against Vega and Demott. The match would prove to be Demott's retirement match, and Team 3D prevailed by putting Vega through a table.

Coastal Championship Wrestling
Vega worked on again off again for the Coastal Championship Wrestling (CCW) company in Miami from 2005 through 2007. Some of his highlights include a pair of victories over Shane Mclain and wins over Preston James, Bruno Sassi, Gino Carruso and a West Miami battle royale. Other highlights include match of the year candidate for a three-way dance featuring Kahagas and Jerry Lynn as well as a CCW championship loss to Shawn Murphy. Vega traveled and worked with CCW in Coral Springs, Ocoee, West Miami and Cocoa Beach.

National Wrestling Alliance
Ricky Vega began his stint with the National Wrestling Alliance in Las Vegas, Nevada at the Orleans Hotel and Casino in fantastic fashion. He defeated Cassidy O'Riley in record-breaking fashion. His thirty-second destruction of O'Riley was and is the quickest victory in the company's storied history. Later Vega earned the honor of wrestling at the Philips Arena in a tribute show to Ric Flair for his induction into the NWA Hall of Fame. During this time Vega also began teaming with Glamour Boy Shane in their run for the IWA tag titles and eventual split and rivalry with one another in Puerto Rico.

Federation X Entertainment
Federation X Entertainment, also known as FXE, began running shows in Orlando, Florida after a very successful run as a wrestling school once headed by Devon Dudley, Matt Bentley and AJ Galant. Ricky Vega trained many of Florida's independent stars of today there and helped mold them with the launch of FXE's Crush Live shows.

International Wrestling Association
On August 17, 2007 Vega signed on with International Wrestling Association (IWA) in Puerto Rico. Vega won his debut match, and went to defeat other wrestler's including Cruzz and El Bacano. During an IWA and National Wrestling Alliance (NWA) interpromotional show, Rob Conway interfered in a match between Glamour Boy Shane and Billy Kidman, prompting Vega to come out to save Shane. This marked the formation of The RS Express tag team, which consisted of Shane and Vega. The RS Express debuted against the IWA World Tag Team Champions The Naturals (Chase Stevens and Andy Douglas), but lost the match by disqualification after The Star Revolution Corporation and Los Aerios, two other teams contending for the tag team title, interfered. The RS Express received a rematch on Total Impact, the IWA's television show, which ended in another disqualification after Douglas hit Vega with the championship belt. In another rematch, Douglas hit Shane with the championship belt, but the referee was distracted by Orlando Toledo, the manager of The Naturals, and so was not disqualified. This resulted in The RS Express challenging The Naturals to a hardcore street fight for the tag team championship belts; however, The Naturals prevailed again due to outside interference from Tim Arson. As a result, a four corners tag team elimination match was booked between The Naturals, The RS Express, Blitz and Chicano, and Tim Arson and Big Vito, with the winner going to Las Vegas to challenge the NWA World Tag Team Champions. The RS Express were eliminated when Arson hit Vega with a fire extinguisher, allowing Douglas to get the pin on Vega. This incident set the stage for a feud between Vega and Arson. Their first match ended in victory for Arson; however, Vega won the second, setting up a rubber match. Vega ended the feud by defeating Arson.

In the middle of a feud with Apolo, Savio Vega began having differences of opinion with Vega concerning Savio's actions towards Apolo. During a no disqualification match between Savio and Apolo, Vega attempted to stop Savio from further assaulting Apolo, as did the IWA World Heavyweight Champion, Blitz. Savio refused to listen to them; however, when Blitz turned to seek further assistance from Vega, Vega attacked him, forming an alliance with Savio. The rest of their newly formed faction came down to ringside, after Vega's former tag team partner, Shane, tried to stop the beating. The faction, later called Los Autenticos, attacked Shane. Vega later blamed Shane for costing him the tag titles and defeated him in a grudge match. In a rematch, which was billed as a Puerto Rican street fight, Vega again came out victorious, and earned a shot at the Undisputed World Heavyweight Championship; however, the match was not a singles match, but a five-way dance, also featuring Blitz as the champion, Shane, Mr. Big from the World Wrestling Council and Bison Smith, who was representing Japan. The five-way dance occurred after a title unification match between Blitz and Big, for the WWC World Championship and the IWA World Heavyweight Championship, the first ever Undisputed World Championship title in the history of Puerto Rico, which Blitz won. Prior to the match, Vega began referring to himself as The Alpha Omega, claiming that the wrestling business begins with and ends with him. Vega won the match, and the Undisputed World Championship by pinning Blitz. He went on to successfully defend the title against Shane Sewell, Germán Figueroa, Ray González, Miguel Perez and Freddie "Blitz" Lozada among others.

In April 2008, a real-life disagreement between Mario Savoldi and Savio Vega meant that the company stopped promoting events, until Savio was awarded the company and its assets after court proceedings. IWA returned to television in May 2008, and a tournament was held for a new IWA Champion. The final match was between Blitz and Chicano; however, Vega returned to the IWA with the title in tow. Vega had been thought to be on the side of Savoldi in his dispute with Savio, which was why the tournament had been set up. Despite this, Vega was entered into the tournament final, making the match a three-way dance. Vega was knocked out of the match by Savio, but later returned to the match as the special guest referee after Savio, the original special guest referee, was knocked out by Blitz. Vega counted out Chicano, making Blitz the new champion. He then aligned himself with Blitz and La Rabia, and challenged Savio for his RXW World Heavyweight Championship. Vega defeated Savio in a non-title match, but then lost the championship match after Savio hired a villainous referee to ensure his win. After the match, Vega was given an emotional send off by the fans perhaps sensing the end was near for high level wrestling in PR and opportunities for the company to import top notch American talent. During his time with the IWA, Vega was recognized as the Undisputed Champion of Puerto Rico, wrestler of the year and was elected as the best wrestler in Latin America during his reign.

Championships and accomplishments
Dynamite Championship Wrestling
DCW Heavyweight Championship (2 times)
International Wrestling Association
IWA World Heavyweight Championship (2 time)
Pro Wrestling Illustrated
PWI ranked Vega as one of the world's best singles wrestlers of the PWI 500 from 2005 through 2009.
World of Unpredictable Wrestling
WUW North American Heavyweight Championship (2 times)

See also
Professional wrestling in Puerto Rico

References

External links
Ricky Vega at Cagematch.de
Ricky Vega at Online World of Wrestling

1976 births
Living people
People from the Bronx
American people of Puerto Rican descent
American male professional wrestlers
Puerto Rican male professional wrestlers